Monticello Carnegie Library, also known as the White County Historical Society, is a former library in the historic Carnegie library building located at Monticello, White County, Indiana. It was built in 1907, and is a two-story, Classical Revival style buff brick building on a raised basement.  It features a large limestone entrance portico and full round arched window openings.  A two-story addition was built in 1957.  The original building was constructed with a $10,000 grant from the Carnegie Foundation.

It was listed on the National Register of Historic Places in 2013. The old Monticello Carnegie Library no longer contains a public library. It functions today as the offices of the White County Indiana Historical Society. The town's present public library is the Monticello-Union Township Public Library at 321 W. Broadway St.

References

Carnegie libraries in Indiana
Libraries on the National Register of Historic Places in Indiana
Neoclassical architecture in Indiana
Library buildings completed in 1907
Buildings and structures in White County, Indiana
National Register of Historic Places in White County, Indiana